The 1985 Dutch Open was a Grand Prix men's tennis tournament staged in Hilversum, Netherlands. The tournament was played on outdoor clay courts and was held from 22 July until 28 July 1985. It was the 29th edition of the tournament. Ricki Osterthun won the singles title.

Finals

Singles

 Ricki Osterthun defeated  Kent Carlsson 4–6, 4–6, 6–4, 6–2, 6–3

Doubles

 Hans Simonsson /  Stefan Simonsson defeated  Carl Limberger /  Mark Woodforde 6–3, 6–4

References

External links
 ITF tournament edition details

Dutch Open (tennis)
Dutch Open (tennis)
Dutch Open
Dutch Open (tennis), 1985